The Saharan Air Layer (SAL) is an extremely hot, dry and sometimes dust-laden layer of the atmosphere that often overlies the cooler, more-humid surface air of the Atlantic Ocean. It carries upwards of 60 million tonnes of dust annually over the ocean and the Americas. This annual phenomenon sometimes cools the ocean and suppresses Atlantic tropical cyclogenesis.

The SAL is a subject of ongoing study and research. Its existence was first postulated in 1972.

Creation 
The dust cloud originates in Saharan Africa and extends from the surface upwards several kilometers. As the dust drives, or is driven out over the Atlantic ocean, it is lifted above the denser marine air. This atmospheric arrangement is an inversion where the temperature actually increases with height, as the boundary between the SAL and the marine layer suppresses or "caps" any convection originating in the marine layer. Since it is dry air, the lapse rate within the SAL itself is steep, that is, the temperature falls rapidly with height.

An estimated 60-200 million tons of dust particles are carried from the Sahara Desert region of North Africa, where it originates, and moves westward annually.

Sometimes a depression to the southwest of the Canary Islands increases the wind speed and intensity of the SAL, which can lift the dust around  into the air and often carries the dust as far as the Caribbean.

Effects 

The SAL passes over the Canary Islands where the phenomenon is named "calima" (English: "haze") and manifests as a fog that reduces visibility and deposits a layer of dust over everything. It is especially prevalent in the winter months. Canary islanders suffer respiratory problems during this weather event, and sometimes the dust is so bad that public life and transport halt completely.

From Northern Africa, winds blow twenty percent of dust from a Saharan storm out over the Atlantic Ocean, and twenty percent of that, or four percent of a single storm's dust, reaches all the way to the western Atlantic. The remainder settles out into the ocean or washes out of the air with rainfall. Scientists believe the July 2000 measurements made in Puerto Rico, nearly 8 million tonnes, equaled about one-fifth of the year's total dust deposits.

The clouds of dust SAL creates are visible in satellite photos as a milky white to gray shade, similar to haze.

Findings to date indicate that the iron-rich dust particles that often occur within the SAL reflect solar radiation, thus cooling the atmosphere. The particles also reduce the amount of sunlight reaching the ocean, thus reducing the amount of heating of the ocean. They also tend to increase condensation as they drift into the marine layer below, but not precipitation as the drops formed are too small to fall and tend not to readily coalesce. These tiny drops are subsequently more easily evaporated as they move into drier air laterally or dry air mixes down from the SAL aloft. Research on aerosols also shows that the presence of small particles in air tends to suppress winds. The SAL has also been observed to suppress the development and intensifying of tropical cyclones, which may be related directly to these factors.

See also
African easterly jet

References

 NOAA FAQ: Saharan Air Layer
 Real Time SAL data
 SAL over the Atlantic, current graphic display
 Research: Aerosols Slow Wind
 HA! Look at 2006! Where are the hurricanes? (SAL role in delaying hurricane season)

External links
NASA's 2013 HS3 Hurricane Mission to Delve into Saharan Dust

Meteorological phenomena
Atlantic Ocean
Sahara
Satellite interpretation
Tropical meteorology
Winds
Environment of Western Sahara